Awit may refer to:

 Awit Award, music awards given annually by the Philippine Association of the Record Industry
 Awit (poem), a Filipino poetry form
 Akl Awit (born 1952), Lebanese journalist